The 2016–17 Green Bay Phoenix women's basketball team represented the University of Wisconsin-Green Bay in the 2016–17 NCAA Division I women's basketball season. The Phoenix, led by head coach Kevin Borseth, in the fifth year of his current stint and 14th year overall at Green Bay, played their home games at the Kress Events Center and are members of the Horizon League. It was the 38th season of Green Bay women's basketball.

On December 13, 2016, after starting the season 8–1, with the one blemish being a four-point loss at then top-ranked Notre Dame, the Phoenix women were voted Team of the Week by the NCAA.

Roster

Rankings

Schedule

|-
!colspan=9 style="background:#006633; color:#FFFFFF;"| Exhibition

|-
!colspan=9 style="background:#006633; color:#FFFFFF;"| Non-conference regular season

|-
!colspan=9 style="background:#006633; color:#FFFFFF;"| Horizon League regular season

|-
!colspan=9 style="background:#006633; color:#FFFFFF;"| Horizon League Women's Tournament

|-
!colspan=9 style="background:#006633; color:#FFFFFF;"| NCAA Women's Tournament

Source:

References

Green Bay Phoenix
Green Bay Phoenix women's basketball seasons
Green Bay